{{Infobox person
|name          = Don McGill

|image_size    = 
|caption       = 
|birth_name    = Don McGill
|birth_date    = 
|birth_place   = New York City, U.S.
|death_date    = 
|death_place   = 
|death_cause   = 
|nationality   = American
|known_for     = CSI, JAG, NUMB3RS, NCIS
|alma_mater    =
|years_active  = 1963-present
|employer      = CBS TV Studios

|occupation    = Writer and Producer}}
Don McGill is an American television producer and writer who assisted with producing and even starred in some episodes of JAG, he also aided in the production and/or writing of such TV series as CSI, NUMB3RS, and NCIS.

Television career
McGill wrote for the TV show NUMB3RS for which he acted as executive producer. He was a producer alongside Donald P. Bellisario on JAG and helped him create NCIS, which McGill also wrote for.

He became the sole executive producer of CSI'' for the show's fifteenth season after long-time show producer Carol Mendelsohn departed from the series, and remained with the series until its cancellation.

Filmography

Television
The numbers in writing credits refer to the number of episodes.

Notes

External links
 

Living people
American television producers
American television writers
American male television writers
1963 births